|}

The Hamburger Stuten-Preis is a Group 3 flat horse race in Germany open to three-year-old thoroughbred fillies. It is run at Hamburg-Horn over a distance of 2,200 metres (about 1 mile and 3 furlongs), and is scheduled to take place each year in late June or early July.

History
The event was established in 1952, and it was originally held at Neuss. It was initially staged in the autumn, and for periods it was called the Herbst Stutenpreis or the Neusser Stutenpreis. It was open to fillies and mares aged three or older and usually contested over 2,100 metres. It was given Group 3 status in 1976.

The race was transferred to Hamburg and extended to 2,200 metres in 1995. From this point it was known as the Deutscher Herold-Preis. An ungraded event titled the Neusser Stutenpreis continued at its former venue until 1997.

The Hamburger Stuten-Preis has had several different names, and some have been assigned to various other races. Its titles have included the Alice-Cup (2005), the Fährhofer Stutenpreis (2006–07), the Grosser Preis der Jungheinrich Gabelstapler (2008–09) and the Mehl-Muhlens Trophy from 2018.

The race was restricted to three-year-old fillies in 2008.

Records
Most successful horse (2 wins):
 Andrea – 1958, 1959

Leading jockey (4 wins):
 Oskar Langner – Imola (1954), Ordenstreue (1966), On Dit (1967), Ordinanz (1968)

Leading trainer (7 wins):
 Heinz Jentzsch – Inga (1969), Sheba (1973), Idrissa (1975), Indian Pearl (1978), La Colorada (1984), Risen Raven (1994), Alpha City (1995)

Winners since 1979

Earlier winners

 1952: Jana
 1953: Gisa
 1954: Imola
 1955: Lustige
 1956: Nadia
 1957: Thila
 1958: Andrea
 1959: Andrea
 1960: Santa Cruz
 1961: Meraviglia
 1962: Ghana
 1963: Ostsee
 1964: Tauchente
 1965: Tigerin
 1966: Ordenstreue
 1967: On Dit
 1968: Ordinanz
 1969: Inga
 1970: Colima
 1971: Monteria
 1972: Ankerwinde
 1973: Sheba
 1974: Little Slam
 1975: Idrissa
 1976: Princess Eboli
 1977: Contenance
 1978: Indian Pearl

See also
 List of German flat horse races
 Recurring sporting events established in 1952 – this race is included under its former title, Neusser Stutenpreis.

References
 Racing Post:

 galopp-sieger.de – Neusser Stutenpreis.
 horseracingintfed.com – International Federation of Horseracing Authorities – Hamburger Stuten-Preis (2012).
 pedigreequery.com – Fährhofer Stutenpreis – Hamburg.
 siegerlisten.com – Hamburger Stutenpreis.

Flat horse races for three-year-old fillies
Horse races in Germany
Sports competitions in Hamburg